The Social Democratic Forum (SDF) was a short-lived political group in Hong Kong formed by the radical faction of the Democratic Party. It consisted mostly the "Young Turks" faction of the Democratic Party which took a more pro-grassroots and street action approaches. It ceased to exist in April 2002 when most members joined The Frontier.

History
It was formed in the background of the intra-party struggles in the Democratic Party in 2000. The factional struggle began in the 1998 Democratic Party leadership election where the Young Turks who believed in more pro-grassroots and radical approaches launched a "coup d'etat", supporting trade unionist Lau Chin-shek to run against incumbent Vice-Chairman Anthony Cheung who was leader of the Meeting Point faction who believed in pro-middle class and moderate methods. The intra-party struggle intensified when Andrew To proposed to put the minimum wage legislation on the 2000 Legislative Council election platform but was defeated by the Mainstreamers faction. The Young Turks faction were discontent with the monopoly of the Central Committee by the party leaders and the party's position on grassroots issues, as well as lack of financial support from the party.

Led by Convenor Fung Chi-wood, SDF core members included Andrew To and Lau San-ching. The SDF took an active role in the campaign against Chief Executive Tung Chee-hwa seeking for second term, co-founding the Hong Kong Democratic Development Network and Coalition Against Secord Term which opposed the unfair Chief Executive election. It protested the "small-circle" Election Committee subsector by-elections and protested against the uncontested election which saw Tung Chee-hwa re-elected for the second term.

In February 2002, the SDF and The Frontier issued a joint platform, demanding amendment of the Basic Law and introducing referendum, protecting judicial independence, introducing competition law, collective bargaining and laws protecting the poor and women. On 17 April 2002, the SDF general meeting announced dissolution of the SDF, in which 25 members including convenor Fung Chi-wood, deputy Steve Chan Kwok-leung, Andrew To, Leung Wing-kuen, Tsui Pak-tai and Lam Sam-shing who had already joined the Frontier, with about 25 other associates, in total of 50 members would join The Frontier, in which 42 would become the party members.

Notable members

 Steve Chan Kwok-leung
 Chui Pak-tai
 Gary Fan
 Fung Chi-wood
 Comas Kwong Kwok-chuen
 Lam Sum-shing
 Lau San-ching
 Leung Wing-kuen
 Andrew To
 Tsang Kin-shing
 Eric Wong Chung-ki

References

2000 establishments in Hong Kong
2002 disestablishments in Hong Kong
Breakways of Democratic Party (Hong Kong)
Defunct political parties in Hong Kong
Liberal parties in Hong Kong
Political parties disestablished in 2002
Political parties established in 2000
Social democratic parties in Hong Kong